Major General Alexander Cambridge, 1st Earl of Athlone (Alexander Augustus Frederick William Alfred George; born Prince Alexander of Teck; 14 April 1874 – 16 January 1957), was a British Army commander and a close relative of the British royal family, who served as Governor-General of the Union of South Africa and Governor General of Canada.

Prince Alexander was born in London to the Duke and Duchess of Teck and was educated at Eton College and the Royal Military College, Sandhurst. In 1904, he married Princess Alice of Albany and rose in the military ranks through his service on the western front of the First World War, receiving numerous honours and decorations.

A cousin and also brother-in-law of King George V, he relinquished his German titles in 1917, including that of Prince of Teck in the Kingdom of Württemberg, and was elevated to the peerage as the Earl of Athlone. He was in 1923 appointed as South Africa's governor-general by the King, on the recommendation of Prime Minister of the United Kingdom Stanley Baldwin, to replace Prince Arthur of Connaught, and he occupied the viceregal post until succeeded by the Earl of Clarendon in 1930. Athlone then served as Chancellor of the University of London until, in 1940, he was appointed as Canada's governor general by King George VI, on the recommendation of Prime Minister of Canada William Lyon Mackenzie King, to replace Lord Tweedsmuir (John Buchan), and he occupied the post until succeeded by Viscount Alexander of Tunis in 1946. Athlone helped galvanise the Canadian war effort and was a host to British and American statesmen during the Second World War.

After returning to the United Kingdom, Athlone sat on the organising committee for the coronation of Queen Elizabeth II. He died at Kensington Palace in 1957 and was interred in the Royal Burial Ground, Frogmore.

Early life, education, and military career

Prince Alexander of Teck was born at Kensington Palace on 14 April 1874, the fourth child and third son of Prince Francis, Duke of Teck, and Princess Mary Adelaide, Duchess of Teck. Although his mother was a granddaughter of King George III and first cousin to Queen Victoria, Athlone, as the son of a prince of Teck in Württemberg, was styled from birth as His Serene Highness and held the title Prince Alexander of Teck. He was known, however, to his family and friends as Alge, derived from the first two letters of Alexander and George, and was characterised as a meticulous individual with a quick, but short-lived, temper and an ability to be cautious and tactful.

When Prince Alexander was nine years old, his parents fled the United Kingdom for continental Europe to escape their high debts. They stayed there for two years. The Prince remained at Eton College before moving on to the Royal Military College, Sandhurst. In October 1894, having completed his officer's training, Prince Alexander was commissioned as a second lieutenant in the 7th Queen's Own Hussars, and shortly after served in the Second Matabele War. He was mentioned in despatches during the conflict and, after its cessation, was appointed on 8 December 1898 by Queen Victoria as a Knight Commander of the Royal Victorian Order. He received a promotion to lieutenant in June 1899 and to captain the following April. For his actions in the Second Boer War, Alexander was, in April 1901, appointed by King Edward VII as a Companion of the Distinguished Service Order.

The announcement came on 16 November 1903 that Prince Alexander had become engaged to his second cousin once removed, Princess Alice of Albany, daughter of Prince Leopold, Duke of Albany, and thus a granddaughter of Queen Victoria and niece of the then soon-to-be Governor General of Canada, Prince Arthur, Duke of Connaught and Strathearn. The two were wed at St. George's Chapel, in Windsor Castle, on 10 February 1904 and, six days later, in celebration of the wedding, the Prince was promoted to the grade of a Knight Grand Cross of the Royal Victorian Order. The couple thereafter had three children: Princess May of Teck, born 1906; Prince Rupert of Teck, born 1907; and Prince Maurice Francis George of Teck. Maurice, however, lived only for less than six months, between 29 March and 14 September 1910.

In the same year Prince Alexander was appointed Chairman of Middlesex Hospital.

First World War
Prior to the outbreak of the Great War in 1914, Prince Alexander, who had been promoted to major in January 1911 and was a brevet lieutenant-colonel commanding the 2nd Life Guards, was nominated by the British Prime Minister H. H. Asquith to serve as Governor General of Canada. However, the Prince was called up for active service with his regiment. taking him to battle in France and Flanders. He was promoted to the rank of lieutenant colonel, with the temporary rank of brigadier-general, in December 1915. For his service on the battlefields, in June 1917 Prince Alexander was appointed by his brother in law, King George V, as a Companion of the Order of St. Michael and St. George.

During the war, anti-German sentiment throughout the British Empire led the King to change the name of the royal house from the Germanic House of Saxe-Coburg and Gotha to the more English House of Windsor, while simultaneously renouncing all Germanic titles for himself and all members of the Royal Family. Through a royal warrant issued on 14 July 1917, Alexander, along with his brother, Prince Adolphus, Duke of Teck, similarly relinquished all of his German titles, styles, and honours, choosing instead the name of Cambridge, after his grandfather, Prince Adolphus, Duke of Cambridge. Alexander was then known simply as Sir Alexander Cambridge (being entitled to the honorific Sir through his knighthoods in the Royal Victorian Order and the Order of the Bath), until, on 7 November 1917, the King created him Earl of Athlone and Viscount Trematon. Athlone had declined a marquessate, as he thought the title did not sound British enough. Athlone's wife retained her royal style and title, while their surviving children became the Lady May Cambridge and Rupert Cambridge, Viscount Trematon. Rupert was to inherit the title of Earl of Athlone, but he died on 15 April 1928, ten days shy of his twenty-first birthday, meaning the third creation of the title became extinct with the death of the first earl.

Post-war career and Governor-General of the Union of South Africa
Following the cessation of hostilities in Europe in 1918, Athlone was promoted to the brevet rank of colonel in June 1919, and retired from the army that November, with the honorary rank of brigadier-general. He took up posts in the civilian world, continuing at Middlesex Hospital. Because of his experience there, he was appointed in 1921 to chair an investigative committee on the needs of doctors. Known as the Athlone Committee, its work resulted in the creation of post-graduate schools for medical education and research, such as the Royal Postgraduate Medical School at Hammersmith Hospital and the London School of Hygiene & Tropical Medicine. In March 1922, he was promoted to the rank of colonel in the Regular Army Reserves, retaining his honorary rank of brigadier-general, and, in 1937, was appointed chair of a committee of inquiry into the arrangements for "recruitment, training and registration and terms and conditions of service" for nurses.

For their London residence, the Athlones used the grace and favour apartments of Princess Alice's mother, the late Duchess of Albany, in the Clock House at Kensington Palace and, in 1923, they acquired a country residence, Brantridge Park, in West Sussex.

In December of the same year, Athlone was appointed by the King as both an honorary major-general and as the Governor-General of the Union of South Africa, replacing his wife's cousin, Prince Arthur of Connaught. He arrived in Pretoria in January 1924 and was immediately at work with his viceregal duties, opening the newly finished parliament building, just weeks before his South African prime minister, Jan Smuts, suddenly advised him to prorogue the legislature.

In the ensuing election—the running of which forced Athlone to cancel the planned tour of Prince Edward, Prince of Wales—the National Party won a majority of seats in the National Assembly, meaning Athlone appointed the party's leader, James Barry Munnik Hertzog, as his new prime minister. At the time, Afrikaner nationalism was increasing in the dominion, and Hertzog was a republican who promoted the secession of South Africa from the British Empire. As such, he proposed the country adopt its own flag over the Union Flag. Athlone, however, proved sympathetic and tactful, and resolved the issue by advancing a flag that was unique to South Africa, but which still contained the Union Flag within it, despite opposition from numerous Afrikaners. He also gained popularity with South Africans of all races through his frequent tours of the country, performing a number of ceremonial duties, including opening Pioneers' Park in Johannesburg.

For his service to the Crown in South Africa, Athlone was appointed by George V as a Knight Companion of the Order of the Garter, on 17 April 1928, and, upon his return to the UK, was made on 4 August 1931 the Governor and Constable of Windsor Castle. The following year, he was also selected as the Chancellor of the University of London, which post he held until 1955.

In January 1939, Athlone was appointed president of The Football Association. The move represented the first time the FA had appointed someone that was not a football administrator to the position.

Governor General of Canada

In Canada in the late 1930s, there had been calls from government circles and the media alike for the King to appoint a Canadian-born individual as governor general. However, with the rush to fill the post after the unexpected death of the incumbent viceroy, Lord Tweedsmuir, and with the country embroiled in the Second World War, Canadian prime minister William Lyon Mackenzie King advised King George VI that the time was not right for such a change in viceregal tradition.

Instead, it was George's uncle, the Earl of Athlone, whose name Mackenzie King put forward and the Earl accepted. Subsequently, Athlone, along with his wife and his aide-de-camp, Alastair Windsor, Earl of Macduff, voyaged to Canada to take up his position, their liner using a submarine-evading zig-zag pattern across the Atlantic Ocean to Halifax, Nova Scotia. After travelling on to Ottawa by train, Athlone was sworn in during a ceremony in the Senate chamber on 21 June 1940. The Athlones' three grandchildren, Anne, Richard, and Elizabeth (children of their daughter May), lived with them in Canada for the duration of the war.

Athlone immediately made himself active in the support of the war effort, travelling across the country and focusing much of his attention on the troops, either those training at military facilities or those injured and in hospital. Viewing his position as governor general as a link between Canadians and their monarch, Athlone also communicated in speeches that the King stood with them in their fight against Adolf Hitler and the Nazi regime.

The war was brought close to home for the Athlones also because many of those belonging to displaced European royal families sought refuge in Canada and resided at or near the royal and viceroyal residence, Rideau Hall. Among the royal guests were Crown Prince Olav and Crown Princess Märtha of Norway; Grand Duchess Charlotte and Prince Felix of Luxembourg; King Peter of Yugoslavia; King George of Greece; Empress Zita of Bourbon-Parma (Austria) and her daughters; as well as Queen Wilhelmina of the Netherlands and her daughter, Princess Juliana. Further, in December 1941, British prime minister Winston Churchill arrived at the residence, where he presided over British Cabinet meetings via telephone from his bed.

It was Athlone's duty to play host at Quebec City to his prime minister, still Mackenzie King, as well as Churchill and United States president Franklin D. Roosevelt, who all gathered to take part in what would become known as the Quebec Conferences, with the first taking place between 17 and 24 August 1943 at the viceregal residence in La Citadelle, and the second occurring from 12 to 16 September 1944 at the Château Frontenac. It was at these meetings that the four men discussed the Allied strategies that would eventually lead to victory over Nazi Germany and Japan. When Germany fell on 8 May 1945 and Japan on 15 August of the same year, Athlone led the national celebrations held on Parliament Hill and elsewhere. He thereafter spoke in speeches about Canada's future being marked not by war but by a strong role in reconstruction and reconciliation.

During his time as the Canadian viceroy, Athlone also lent his status to various charitable and other social events, and mounted a number of activities of his own, such as tobogganing parties and skating lessons on the grounds of Rideau Hall, as well as skiing in Gatineau Park. When he departed Canada at the end of his time as the King's representative, Athlone left as a legacy the Athlone Fellowship, awarded by the Engineering Institute of Canada.

Post-viceregal life

After Lord Athlone's replacement as governor general was appointed on 21 March 1946, he returned to the United Kingdom to retirement, taking up residence again in a grace and favour apartment at Kensington Palace and, on 1 September of that year, resigning as colonel of the 7th Queen's Own Hussars. He did not completely remove himself from public activity, however, and was, along with his Canadian viceregal successor, Lord Alexander of Tunis, appointed to the committee charged with organising the coronation in 1953 of Athlone's great-niece, Queen Elizabeth II, and continued to sit as Chancellor of the University of London until 1955.

The Earl of Athlone died at Kensington on 16 January 1957 at the age of 82, and was interred in the Royal Vault at St George's Chapel, Windsor Castle, on 19 January before being transferred to the Royal Burial Ground at Frogmore on 15 May 1957. He was the last surviving great-grandchild of George III.

Honours

Orders
 1888 – 14 July 1917: Grand Cross of the Order of the Württemberg Crown
 8 December 1898 – 16 February 1901: Knight Commander of the Royal Victorian Order (KCVO)
 16 February 1901 – 16 January 1957: Knight Grand Cross of the Royal Victorian Order (GCVO)
 19 April 1901: Companion of the Distinguished Service Order (DSO)
 1904 – 14 July 1917: Knight of the Order of the Rautenkrone
 22 July 1904 – 14 July 1917: Grand Cross with Crown in Ore of the House Order of the Wendish Crown
 5 August 1904 – 16 January 1957: Knight of Justice of the Venerable Order of St John (KStJ)
 19 June 1911 – 16 January 1957: Knight Grand Cross of the Most Honourable Order of the Bath (civil division) (GCB)
 4 June 1917 – 6 November 1923: Companion of the Most Distinguished Order of St Michael and St George (CMG)
 6 November 1923 – 24 June 1936: Knight Grand Cross of the Most Distinguished Order of St Michael and St George (GCMG)
 24 June 1936 – 16 January 1957: Grand Master of the Most Distinguished Order of St Michael and St George
 17 April 1928 – 16 January 1957: Knight of the Most Noble Order of the Garter (KG)

Appointments
 29 June 1931 – 16 January 1957: Privy Counsellor (PC)
 4 August 1931 – 16 January 1957: Governor and Constable of Windsor Castle
 1937 – 16 January 1957: Fellow of the Royal Society
 21 June 1940 – 12 April 1946: Chief Scout for Canada
 1940 – 16 January 1957: Honorary Member of the Royal Military College of Canada Club

Medals
 1897: British South Africa Company Medal
 1897: Queen Victoria Diamond Jubilee Medal
 1901: Queen's South Africa Medal
 1902: King Edward VII Coronation Medal
 1911: King George V Coronation Medal
 1919: 1914–15 Star
 1919: British War Medal
 1919: Victory Medal
 1935: King George V Silver Jubilee Medal
 1937: King George VI Coronation Medal
 1945: 1939–45 Star
 1945: War Medal 1939–1945
 1947: Canadian Volunteer Service Medal
 1953: Queen Elizabeth II Coronation Medal

Awards
 1896: Mentioned in Despatches
 1915: Mentioned in Despatches
 1915: Mentioned in Despatches
 1 January 1935: Royal Victorian Chain

Foreign honours and decorations
 1909 – 16 January 1957: Commander Grand Cross of the Royal Order of the North Star
 24 October 1915 – 16 January 1957: Grand Cordon of the Order of Leopold
 24 February 1916: Military Cross
 9 December 1916: Grand Officer of the National Order of the Legion of Honour
 14 January 1918 – 16 January 1957: Knight 1st Class with Swords of the Imperial Order of St Anna
 16 April 1918: Croix de guerre

Honorary military appointments
 3 June 1910 – 16 January 1957: Personal Aide-de-Camp to the King (ADC)
 Colonel of the Life Guards
 1930 – 16 January 1957: Colonel-in-Chief of the Duke of Edinburgh's Own Rifles
 21 June 1940 – 12 April 1946: Colonel of the Governor General's Horse Guards
 21 June 1940 – 12 April 1946: Colonel of the Governor General's Foot Guards
 21 June 1940 – 12 April 1946: Colonel of the Canadian Grenadier Guards

Honorific eponyms
Awards
: Athlone Institute Bursary Project Fund, Paarl

Geographic locations
: Athlone, Edmonton
: Athlone
: Athlone, Cape Town

Buildings
: Athlone Power Station, Cape Town
: Athlone Stadium, Cape Town

Schools
: Athlone Elementary School, Edmonton
: Athlone School, Winnipeg
: Athlone House, Queen's College, Queenstown
: Athlone Boys High School, Johannesburg
: Athlone Institute, Paarl

Arms

Ancestry

See also
 Rupert Cambridge, Viscount Trematon

Notes

References

External links

Website of the Governor General of Canada entry for Lord Athlone
"Alexander Cambridge, Earl of Athlone". The Canadian Encyclopedia
"The Late Earl of Athlone" Tributes to the Earl of Athlone by members of the House of Lords, 22 January 1957, as reported in Hansard
 

1874 births
1957 deaths
People from Kensington
7th Queen's Own Hussars officers
British Army personnel of the Second Boer War
British Army cavalry generals of World War I
Burials at the Royal Burial Ground, Frogmore
Chancellors of the University of London
Earls in the Peerage of the United Kingdom
Cambridge, Alexander
Governors General of Canada
Governors-General of South Africa
Alexander of Teck
People of the Second Matabele War
Royal Military College of Canada people
Presidents of the Football Association
Graduates of the Royal Military College, Sandhurst
German princes
World War II political leaders
Knights of Justice of the Order of St John
Companions of the Distinguished Service Order
Members of the Privy Council of the United Kingdom
Knights Grand Cross of the Order of Orange-Nassau
Knights Grand Cross of the Order of St Michael and St George
Knights Grand Cross of the Order of the Bath
Knights Grand Cross of the Royal Victorian Order
Knights of the Garter
Recipients of the Order of St. Anna, 1st class
Commanders Grand Cross of the Order of the Polar Star
Scouting and Guiding in Canada
Recipients of the Croix de Guerre 1914–1918 (France)
Chief Scouts of Canada
Peers created by George V
Military personnel from Middlesex
British Army major generals
Royal reburials